Scott Robert Cassidy (born October 3, 1975) is a former relief pitcher who played in Major League Baseball from 2002 to 2006. Cassidy played with the Toronto Blue Jays (2002), Boston Red Sox (2005) and San Diego Padres (2005–2006). Before his professional career, Cassidy pitched for the USC Aiken Pacers from 1994 to 1995. He batted and threw right-handed.

Life as a Blue Jay
Cassidy Scott began his MLB career with the Toronto Blue Jays in 2002 appearing in 58 games and logging 66.0 innings. He ended his first season with a 1–4 record with an ERA of 5.73 in 58 games.

He then spent 2003 in Triple-A where he was pitching for the Syracuse SkyChiefs as a reliever.

Dealt to Boston
On April 18, 2004, the Jays traded Cassidy to their AL East rival, the Boston Red Sox, for a player to be named. Scott did not prove to be a major acquisition as he finished the 2004 campaign playing on the Red Sox's Triple-A affiliate in Pawtucket. He also spent the first part of the 2005 year in Triple-A splitting time between the Pawtucket and Portland squads.

He then pitched in 1 game for Boston coming in as a relief pitcher. He was traded on July 19, 2005, for the second time in his career. This time it was to a team in the National League, the San Diego Padres. Outfielder Adam Hyzdu came over to Boston in return.

Pitching in the NL
With San Diego for the second half of 2005, he had a 1–1 record with a much lower ERA then he had as a member of the Red Sox at 6.57. In 2006, he posted a much more respectable 2.53 ERA while winning 6 games.

He threw 42.2 innings in his 42 appearances all of which came out of the bullpen as a reliever. Cassidy signed a minor league contract with the Milwaukee Brewers on December 3, 2007, but announced his retirement on March 2, 2008.

Pitching style
Cassidy primarily throws an 88-90 MPH fastball, and a 78-81 MPH slider. He throws an occasional changeup around 80 MPH, and a curveball around 77 MPH.

References

External links

1975 births
Living people
American expatriate baseball players in Canada
Baseball players from Syracuse, New York
Boston Red Sox players
Hagerstown Suns players
Le Moyne Dolphins baseball players
Major League Baseball pitchers
Pawtucket Red Sox players
Portland Beavers players
San Diego Padres players
Toronto Blue Jays players
USC Aiken Pacers baseball players
Liverpool High School alumni
Dunedin Blue Jays players
Medicine Hat Blue Jays players
Syracuse SkyChiefs players
Tennessee Smokies players